Halocoryza maindroni is a species of brown coloured ground beetle in the subfamily Scaritinae which can be found on Comoros, Madagascar, Mauritius, Mayotte, and Réunion, as well as in Djibouti, Saudi Arabia, and Somalia.

References

Beetles described in 1919
Beetles of Africa
Beetles of Asia
Scaritinae